The Israeli annexation of East Jerusalem, known to Israelis as the reunification of Jerusalem, refers to the Israeli occupation of East Jerusalem during the 1967 Six-Day War, and its annexation.
Jerusalem was envisaged as a separate, international city under the 1947 United Nations partition plan. It was, however, divided by the 1948 war that followed Israel's declaration of independence. As a result of the 1949 Armistice Agreements, the city's western half came under Israeli control, while its eastern half, containing the famed Old City, fell under Jordanian control. In 1950, Jordan annexed East Jerusalem as part of its larger annexation of the West Bank.

Israel occupied East Jerusalem during the 1967 Six-Day War; since then, the entire city has been under Israeli control. In Israel, the reunification of Jerusalem is celebrated is commemorated as Jerusalem Day, an annual holiday. In July 1980, the Knesset passed the Jerusalem Law as part of the country's Basic Law, which declared unified Jerusalem the capital of Israel, formalizing its effective annexation. The United Nations Security Council ruled the law "null and void" in United Nations Security Council Resolution 478.

Background
Jordan and an alliance of Arab states rejected the 1947 UN Partition Plan under which Jerusalem was to be a corpus separatum, instead invading former Palestinian Mandate territory, and by the armistice in 1949 was in control of the Old City and East Jerusalem (excluding Mount Scopus). The Arab invading armies failed to take control over the rest of Israel, including  West Jerusalem. The city was then divided along the 1949 Armistice Line. East Jerusalem was annexed to Jordan in 1950. The city remained divided until the Six-Day War in 1967.

As part of the Jordanian campaign, on June 5, 1967, the Jordanian Army began shelling Israel. When the Israeli cabinet convened to decide how to respond, Yigal Allon and Menahem Begin argued that this was an opportunity to take the Old City of Jerusalem, but Eshkol decided to defer any decision until Moshe Dayan and Yitzhak Rabin could be consulted. During the late afternoon of June 5, the Israelis launched an offensive to encircle Jerusalem, which lasted into the following day. On June 7, heavy fighting ensued. Dayan had ordered his troops not to enter the Old City; however, upon hearing that the UN was about to declare a ceasefire, he changed his mind, and without cabinet clearance, decided to capture it.

De facto annexation
The government passed legal measures following the occupation to cement the annexation.

Although it was claimed that the application of the Israeli law to East Jerusalem was not annexation, this position was rejected by the Israeli Supreme Court. In a 1970 majority ruling, Justice Y. Kahan expressed the opinion ". . . As far as I am concerned, there is no need for any certificate from the Foreign Minister or from any administrative authority to determine that East Jerusalem. . . was annexed to the State of Israel and constitutes part of its territory. . . by means of these two enactments and consequently this area constitutes part of the territory of Israel."

On  30 July 1980, the Knesset officially approved the Jerusalem Law, which called the city the complete and united capital.

Impact
Under Jordanian rule no Jews were permitted to live in the city, which was governed as part of the Jordanian rule West Bank, and the Christian population plummeted, falling from 25,000 to 9,000. 

Freedom of worship by members of all faiths was restored immediately following reunification. The Mugrabi Quarter was bulldozed in order to expand the plaza. In later years, synagogues demolished during the Jordanian rule, including the Hurva Synagogue were rebuilt.

Under the direction of Nahman Avigad, the city's Jewish Quarter, which had largely lain in rubble, was carefully excavated before being rebuilt. The complete rebuilding of the city's historic Jewish Quarter offered a virtually blank slate for city planners. The reunification is celebrated by the annual Jerusalem Day, and Israeli national holiday. Special celebrations in 2017 to marked the Jubilee of the 1967 reunification.

International reaction
General Assembly Resolutions 2253 and 2254 of July 4 and 14, 1967, respectively, considered Israeli activity in Eastern Jerusalem illegal and asked Israel to cancel those activities and especially not to change the features of the city. On 21 May 1968, United Nations Security Council Resolution 252 invalidated legal and administrative measures by Israel in violation of UNGA Resolutions 2253 and 2254 and required those measures be rescinded.

UN criticism since 1967 includes UNSC resolutions in addition to 252, 267 (1969) , 298 (1971) and resolution 476 (1980), regretting changes in the characteristics of Jerusalem, and resolution 478 (1980), where UN Member States were asked to withdraw their embassies from the city. Resolution 478 also "condemned in "the strongest terms" the enactment of Israeli law proclaiming a change in status of Jerusalem." while Resolution  2334 of 2016 condemned all Israeli settlements in occupied territory including East Jerusalem.

See also 
 Positions on Jerusalem
 United Nations Security Council Resolution 271
 United Nations Security Council Resolution 465
 United Nations General Assembly resolution ES-10/L.22

Notes

References

Divided cities
1960s in Jerusalem
Annexation
East Jerusalem